McPhee/Parker/Lazro is a live album by saxophonists Joe McPhee, Evan Parker and Daunik Lazro recorded in France in 1995 and first released on the Vand'Oeuvre label.

Reception

AllMusic reviewer Thom Jurek states "This isn't a noodle fest, but it is very subdued with little change in dynamic throughout. This is a disc for people who like to think about the saxophone or hear Joe McPhee practice with a couple of other guys".

Track listing 
All compositions by Joe McPhee, Evan Parker and Daunik Lazro
 "The Emmet's Inch" - 36:59 		
 "The Snake and the Scorpion" (McPhee, Parker) - 4:36	
 "Fire on the Water" (Lazro, McPhee) - 7:06
 "And Eagle's Mile" - 14:53

Personnel 
Joe McPhee - pocket trumpet, soprano saxophone, alto saxophone, alto clarinet
Evan Parker - soprano saxophone, tenor saxophone
Daunik Lazro - alto saxophone, baritone saxophone

References 

Joe McPhee live albums
Evan Parker live albums
1996 live albums